The 1922 Iowa State Cyclones football team represented Iowa State College of Agricultural and Mechanic Arts—now known as Iowa State University—during the 1922 college football season. The Cyclones were coached by Sam Willaman and played their home games at State Field in Ames, Iowa. The Cyclones first game was a loss to Coe and their last game was a 54–6 loss to the Nebraska Cornhuskers in Lincoln. The Cyclones finished with a record of 2–6.

Schedule

References

Iowa State
Iowa State Cyclones football seasons
Iowa State Cyclones football